Agárrese (Eng.: Hang On) is the title of a studio album released by duranguense ensemble Grupo Montéz de Durango. This album became their fifth number-one set on the Billboard Top Latin Albums.

Track listing
The information from Billboard.

Chart performance

Year-End Charts

Sales and certifications

References 

2007 albums
Grupo Montez de Durango albums
Spanish-language albums
Disa Records albums